"Impossible" is the third single by Daniel Merriweather taken from his second album Love & War. The single was released on August 17, 2009. It was produced by Mark Ronson and released on the Columbia record label.

Track list

Digital download bundle 
"Impossible"
"Impossible" (Joey Negro Club Mix)

iTunes Digital download bundle 
"Impossible"
"Impossible" (Joey Negro Club Mix)
"Impossible" (Sticky Remix)

Charts
The song peaked at number sixty-seven on the UK Singles Chart, after the release of the digital single. It, however, reached the top 40 in Germany and number one in Greece.

References

2009 singles
Daniel Merriweather songs
Songs written by Mark Ronson
Song recordings produced by Mark Ronson
Music videos directed by Anthony Mandler
2009 songs
Columbia Records singles
Number-one singles in Greece
Songs written by Daniel Merriweather